Poor Little Rich Girls is a United Kingdom reality television program that allowed women from very different professions and classes to switch places to see how the other half lives. The six-part series, directed by Iain Thompson and produced by Simon Kerfoot and Helen Royle, first aired in 2004 on ITV.

Premise
During the two-week taping of each show, the women not only take on one another's jobs, but also inhabit each other's homes and cut off all contact with their own friends and family. Episodes included a swap between DJ and model Sassy Porter and cleaning woman Leanne Rodrigues, who was subsequently offered a modeling career of her own, and between model Katie Downes and toilet cleaner Michelle McManus.

See also
 Wife Swap

Further reading
 Review of debut, The Sunday Mirror

References

External links 
 

British reality television series
British dating and relationship reality television series
ITV (TV network) original programming